Lookout Pass is a mountain pass in the Rocky Mountains of the northwestern United States.

Lookout Pass is the eastern border of northern Idaho's Silver Valley, and has the distinction of being "Exit 0" on Interstate 90 in Montana.  Established  in 1935, Lookout Pass Ski and Recreation Area is on the eastbound side of the highway, straddling the border. The state border line is the ridge line of the mountains and at the pass runs briefly east–west, with Idaho on the north side and Montana the south.

The pass separates the communities of Mullan in Shoshone County, Idaho,  and Saltese in Mineral County, Montana. It is the highest point on Interstate 90 between Seattle and Missoula. The pass is also a time zone border, with northern Idaho on Pacific Time and Montana on Mountain Time. Eastbound on I-90, its elevation is not surpassed until beyond Deer Lodge.

The pass was formerly traversed by the Northern Pacific Railway and the right-of-way is still intact and used as a rail trail. The  tunnel was completed  in 1908 and is part of the Route of the Hiawatha rail trail.

See also
 Lookout Pass Ski and Recreation Area
 Mountain passes in Montana
 List of passes of the Rocky Mountains

References

External links
 Webcam - Lookout Pass from Idaho Transportation Department 
 Webcam - Lookout Pass from Montana Department of Transportation
 David Rumsey Map Collection – Historic road map (1937) – Idaho, Montana, Wyoming – Texaco (Rand McNally)
Idaho highway map (1956) – Shell (H.M. Gousha)

Mountain passes of Idaho
Mountain passes of Montana
Landforms of Shoshone County, Idaho
Landforms of Mineral County, Montana
Borders of Idaho
Borders of Montana
Transportation in Shoshone County, Idaho
Transportation in Mineral County, Montana
Idaho Panhandle National Forest
Interstate 90
Rail mountain passes of the United States